The term ranked voting, also known as preferential voting or ranked choice voting refers to any voting system in which voters rank their candidates or options—in a sequence of first, second, third, and so on—on their respective ballots. Ranked voting systems differ on the basis of how the ballots are marked, how the preferences are tabulated and counted, how many seats are filled, and whether voters are allowed to rank candidates equally. An electoral system that uses ranked voting uses one of the many available counting methods to select the winning candidate or candidates. There is also variation among ranked voting electoral systems in that in some ranked voting systems, officials require voters to rank a set number of candidates, sometimes all of them; in others, citizens may rank as many candidates as they see fit.

Election of single members using ranked votes is often instant-runoff voting.  Election of multiple members using ranked votes is usually single transferable voting (STV).  Other systems may be used to select single members or for multi-member elections. Ranked voting in multi-member districts is used in national elections in Australia, Ireland, Malta, the United Kingdom (Scottish and Welsh Parliaments), single-winner ranked voting is used to elect national-level politicians from the states of Maine and Alaska in the United States.  Ranked voting is used in Slovenia, and Nauru. It is used for some local elections in New Zealand. It is used in the United States by some cities, counties, and federal primaries in 16 states plus 5 more states' overseas voters, for federal elections.

History of ranked voting

The first known reference to ranked voting is found in the writings of Ramon Llull at the end of the 13th century. His meaning is not always clear. Llull is believed to have supported Copeland's method that used a sequence of two-way elections rather than ranked-choice ballots. In the early 15th century, his writings came to the attention of Nicholas of Cusa. Nicholas seems little influenced by them and independently developed what is now called the Borda count. This method uses ranked ballots. Llull's and Nicholas's writings were then lost, resurfacing in the twentieth century. The modern study of ranked voting began when Jean-Charles de Borda published a paper in 1781 which advocated the method now associated with his name. This method drew criticism from the Marquis de Condorcet. He developed a method for recognizing a collective preference. He believed that Borda's approach did not always identify the preference of a group. However, his example remains controversial: see Comparison of electoral systems).

Interest in the topic revived in the nineteenth century when Dane Carl Andræ developed the Single Transferable Vote (STV) system.  His home country, Denmark, adopted the STV voting system in 1855. Thomas Hare also reinvented STV in the UK about the same time, in 1857. William Robert Ware proposed STV's single-winner variant, IRV (Instant Runoff Voting), around 1870. Ware may have been unaware that Condorcet had previously mentioned it, but only to condemn it.

Tasmania was the first place in the world to use ranked voting in government elections in the 1890s. This was STV. It came into broader use in Australia starting in the 1910s. By 1920s, ranked voting was used in cities in Ireland and South Africa, and in 20 cities in Canada and about the same number in the U.S. In these elections, mayors and other single officials were elected through Instant Runoff Voting, while multiple officials such as councillors or school board trustees were elected through STV. Ranked voting was also used in government elections in Ireland, Malta and Canada (Alberta and Manitoba) starting in the 1920s.

Theoretical modeling of electoral processes began with a 1948 paper by Duncan Black, which was quickly followed by Kenneth Arrow's work on the consistency of voting criteria. The topic has received academic attention ever since under the rubric of social choice theory, generally incorporated under economics. In November 2016, voters in Maine approved Question 5, implementing a ranked choice voting system for all elections. It was first used in 2018, the first time a ranked choice voting system was used for a statewide election in the United States. In November 2020, Alaska voters approved Measure 2, which implemented ranked choice voting beginning in 2022.

Theoretical properties of ranked voting

Condorcet criterion

Several of the concepts developed by the Marquis de Condorcet in the eighteenth century still play a central role in the subject. If there is a candidate whom most voters prefer to every other candidate, this candidate is known as the Condorcet winner. A voting method that always elects the Condorcet winner, if there is one, is defined as the Condorcet consistent or equivalently to satisfy the Condorcet criterion. Methods with this property are known as Condorcet methods.

Suppose there is no Condorcet winner in an election. In that case, there must be a Condorcet cycle, which an example can illustrate. Suppose that there are three candidates, A, B, and C, and 30 voters such that ten vote C–B–A, ten vote B–A–C, and ten vote A–C–B. Then there is no Condorcet winner. In particular, we see that A cannot be a Condorcet winner because  of voters chose B to A. However, B cannot be a Condorcet winner because  prefer C to B, and C cannot be a Condorcet winner because  prefer A to C. But A cannot be a Condorcet winner. Thus, searching for a Condorcet winner takes us in circles without finding one.

Spatial models

A spatial model is a model of the electoral process developed by Duncan Black and extended by Anthony Downs. Every voter and every candidate is assumed to occupy a location in the space of opinions that may have one or more dimensions, and voters are supposed to prefer the closer of two candidates to the more distant. A political spectrum is a simple spatial model in one dimension.

The diagram shows a simple spatial model in one dimension, illustrating the voting methods later in this article. A's supporters are assumed to vote A–B–C and C's to vote C–B–A while B's are split equally between having A and C as second preference. According to the table shown, if there are 100 voters, then the ballot cast will be determined by voters' and candidates' positions in the spectrum.

Spatial models are important because they are a natural way of visualizing voters' opinions. They lead to an important theorem, the median voter theorem, also due to Black. It asserts that for a wide class of spatial models – including all unidimensional models and all symmetric models in higher dimensions – a Condorcet winner is guaranteed to exist and be the candidate closest to the median of the voter distribution.

Suppose we apply these ideas to the diagram.  In that case, we see that there is indeed a Condorcet winner – B – who is preferred to A by 64% and to C by 66% and that the Condorcet winner is indeed the candidate closest to the median of the voter distribution.

Other theorems

Arrow's impossibility theorem casts a more pessimistic light on ranked voting. While the median voter theorem tells us that it is easy to devise a voting method that works perfectly for many sets of voter preferences, Arrow's theorem says that it is impossible to develop a technique that works perfectly in all cases.

Whether Arrow's pessimism or Black's optimism more accurately describes electoral behavior is a matter that needs to be determined empirically. Some studies, including a paper by Tideman and Plassman, suggest that simple spatial models of the type satisfying the median voter theorem give a close match to observed voter behavior. Another pessimistic result, Gibbard's theorem (from Allan Gibbard), asserts that any voting system must be vulnerable to tactical voting.

Borda count

The Borda count assigns a score to each candidate by adding a number of points awarded by each ballot. If there are m candidates, then the first-ranked candidate in a ballot receives m – 1 points, the second gets m – 2, and so on until the last-ranked candidate receives none. In the example provided B is elected with 130 of the total 300 points.

The Borda count is simple to implement but does not satisfy the Condorcet criterion. It has a particular weakness in that its result can be strongly influenced by the nomination of candidates who do not themselves stand any chance of being elected.

Other positional systems 
Voting systems that award points in this way but possibly using a different formula are positional systems. Where the score vector (m – 1, m – 2,... ,0) corresponds to the Borda count, (1, , ,... ,1/m ) defines the Dowdall system and (1, 0,... ,0) equates to first-past-the-post.

Alternative vote (instant-runoff voting)

Alternative vote, also known as instant-runoff voting (IRV) and ranked-choice voting in the United States, eliminates candidates in a series of rounds.  The ranking allows the voter to determine how the vote is to be transferred if the first preference is found to be un-electable or if they are elected with surplus votes.  IRV eliminates candidates in a series of rounds, emulating the effect of separate ballots on shrinking sets of candidates. The first round consists of the votes as cast. If no candidate has a majority of the vote in the first count, the candidate with the fewest votes is identified (in this case B) and deleted from the count for subsequent rounds. Their votes are transferred as per the next marked preference, if any. This continues until one candidate has a majority of votes (a combination of first-preference votes and votes transferred from other candidates).

In the example, in the second round, A has taken a majority of votes and is declared elected. In effect, the voters expressed preferences between the last two candidates (more generally m – 1). We stop because A is the preference of the majority of the voters. Elimination systems require each vote that is to be transferred needs to be examined to allow the voter's personal ranking to have effect, rather than allocating seats from a simple table of derived statistics such as under party-list PR.

IRV does not satisfy the Condorcet winner criterion. Unlike most ranked voting systems, IRV does not allow tied preferences except sometimes between a voter's least preferred candidates. A version of single transferable vote applying to the ranking of parties was proposed for elections in Germany in 2013 as spare vote.

Single transferable vote 

Example of an STV election
three to be elected
100 votes      quota (Droop)  26

Single transferable vote (STV) is a multi-winner and proportional version of IRV. Like in IRV, in STV secondary preferences are contingent votes – only used when the first preference cannot be used effectively. Under STV, each voter has just one vote (but is able to mark back-up preferences), and an elector's vote is initially allocated to their most-preferred candidate. After (or if) candidate(s) are elected (winners) by reaching quota, surplus votes are transferred from winners to remaining candidates (hopefuls) according to the voters' ordered preferences. If seats still need to be filled, candidate(s) are eliminated and their voters transferred to remaining candidates. Different forms of STV may have different methods of eliminating candidates and conducting transfer of votes.

Minimax

The minimax system determines a result by constructing a results table. An entry for every pair of distinct candidates shows how often the first is preferred to the second. Using the table of ranked votes in the Spatial Model section above, we see that since 51 voters prefer A to C and 49 have the opposite preference, the (A,C) entry reads '51:49'. In each row, we identify the least satisfactory (i.e., minimal) result for the first candidate (shown in bold). The winning candidate has the fewest least preferred results and is most favourable (i.e., maximal). In the example, the winner is B, whose least Preferred result is winning. In contrast, the other candidates' least favourable results are slightly different losses.

Determining the minimax winner from a set of ballots is a straightforward operation. The method satisfies the Condorcet criterion and can be seen as electing the Condorcet winner, if there is one, and selecting the candidate who comes closest to being a Condorcet winner (under a simple metric) otherwise.

Llull's method / Copeland's method

Copeland's method assigns each candidate a score derived from the results table as shown above for minimax. The score is simply the number of favorable results in the candidate's row, i.e., the number of other candidates a particular candidate was preferred to by a majority of voters. The candidate with the highest score (in this case B) wins.

Copeland's method is Condorcet-consistent and straightforward but, for specific patterns of voter preferences (with no Condorcet winner), it will yield a tie however large the electorate.  Its advocates, therefore, generally recommend its use in conjunction with a tie-break. Suitable rules for this purpose include minimax, IRV, and the Borda count, the last of which gives the Dasgupta-Maskin method.

Other methods
 Ranked voting is different from cardinal voting,  where candidates are independently rated rather than ranked.
 A Condorcet completion elects the Condorcet winner if there is one and otherwise falls back on a separate procedure for determining the result. If the Borda count is the fallback, we get Black's method; if we use IRV, we get Nicolaus Tideman Condorcet-Hare.
 The Bottom-Two-Runoff IRV or BTR-IRV is Condorcet-consistent and a simple modification to IRV.
 Coombs' method is a simple modification of IRV. The candidate eliminated in each round has the most last-place preferences rather than the fewest first-place choices (so C rather than B is eliminated in the first round of the example and B is the winner). Coombs' method is not Condorcet-consistent but satisfies the median voter theorem. It has the drawback that it relies mainly on voters' last-place preferences, which may be chosen with less care than their first places.
 Baldwin's and Nanson's methods use more complicated elimination rules based on the Borda count. They are Condorcet-consistent.
 The Kemeny-Young method is complex but Condorcet-consistent.
 Smith's method reduces the set of candidates to the Smith set, a singleton comprising the Condorcet winner if there is one and is otherwise usually smaller than the original set. It is generally advocated for use in conjunction with a tie-break, with IRV and minimax the commonest. It is computationally simple though not intuitive to most voters.
 The contingent vote is a 2-round version of IRV, and the supplementary vote is a restricted form of contingent vote.
 Bucklin's method exists in several forms, some of which are Condorcet-consistent.
 The ranked pairs method, including Schulze method, Schulze STV, and Split cycle method, are Condorcet-consistent methods of medium computational complexity based on analyzing the cycle structure of ballots.
 Dodgson's method is famous chiefly for having been devised by Lewis Carroll. It is Condorcet-consistent but computationally complex.
 Expanding Approvals Rule

Comparison of ranked voting methods

The simplest form of comparison is through argument by example. The example in the present article illustrates what many people would consider a weakness of IRV; other examples show asserted flaws in different methods. Logical voting criteria can be thought of as extrapolating the salient features of examples into infinite spaces of elections. The consequences are often hard to predict: initially, reasonable measures contradict and reject otherwise satisfactory voting methods.

Empirical comparisons can be performed using simulated elections. Populations of voters and candidates are constructed under a spatial (or other) model. The accuracy of each voting method – defined as the frequency with which it elects the candidate closest to the centre of the voter distribution – can be estimated by random trials. Condorcet methods (and Coombs' method) give the best results, followed by the Borda count, with IRV some way behind and first-past-the-post worst of all. Mathematical properties of voting methods must be balanced against pragmatic features, such as intelligibility to average voters.

Drawbacks of ranked voting
Ranked voting allows voter to select candidates that more accurately represent their preferences than first-past-the-post ballots. It allows that one candidate will get 50%+1 of the vote.  However, they are more complicated.If there are a large number of candidates, which is quite common in single transferable vote elections, then it is likely that many preference voting patterns will be unique to individual voters, which could allow voters to identify themselves in a context of corruption or intimidation, undermining the secrecy of ballots. In the 2002 Irish general election, the electronic votes were published for the Dublin North constituency.

See also 

 Approval Voting
 Arrow's impossibility theorem
 Comparison of electoral systems
 Cardinal voting
 Condorcet winner criterion
 Election
 Gibbard's theorem
 Group voting ticket
 History and use of instant-runoff voting
 Implicit utilitarian voting
 Instant-runoff voting
 List of electoral systems by country
 Matrix vote
 Multiwinner voting
 Median voter theorem
 Preferential block voting
 :Category:Preferential electoral systems
 Ranked-choice voting in the United States
 Social choice theory
 Spoiler effect
 Voting methods in deliberative assemblies

References

External links

 Explainer video: How does ranked-choice voting work?, Minnesota Public Radio MPR.org
 Ballotpedia: "Ranked Choice Voting"
 Examples from RCV123.org
 US State of Maine, 2020 Ballot
 US State of Alaska, 2021 Ballot
 FairVote.Org

Instant-runoff voting
 
Electoral systems
 
Proportional representation electoral systems
Psephology
Public choice theory
Social choice theory